David Loera (born September 10, 1998) is a professional soccer player who plays as a midfielder for USL Championship side San Antonio FC. Born in Spain, he has represented the United States at youth level.

Career

Early career
As a youth, Loera played with the Orlando City Development Academy team. In July 2016, Loera made his Orlando City B debut in USL, coming on as a 54th minute substitute against Louisville City, the first player to appear for Orlando's USL affiliate while still in the academy. He made seven appearances for the team between 2016 and 2017.

College career
In February 2017, Loera signed a letter of intent to play college soccer at North Carolina State University. In three seasons at NC State, Loera started in all 57 of his appearances for the Wolfpack, scoring nine goals and adding 15 assists. Ahead of his final season, he was named to the MAC Hermann Trophy Watch List and reached No. 13 on Top Drawer Soccer’s Men’s National Top-100 list, the highest ranked player in the Atlantic Coast Conference.

Orlando City
Ahead of the 2020 season, Loera returned to Orlando City, signing a multi-year Homegrown contract with the club. He made his professional debut on 3 October 2020 as a stoppage time substitute in a 3–1 win over New York Red Bulls.

On September 9, 2021, Loera joined Phoenix Rising of the USL Championship on loan for the rest of the season. Loera had his contract option declined by Orlando City at the end of the 2021 season.

San Antonio FC
On January 11, 2022, Loera signed with USL Championship club San Antonio FC.

International
In 2016, Loera was called up to the United States U19 squad by head coach Brad Friedel for the Copa de Atlantico tournament. He played in all three games as the United States lost 1–0 to Spain U19, 5–0 to France U19, and 1–0 to the Canary Islands.

Career statistics

Club 
As of November 8, 2021

References

External links

 
US Soccer bio

1998 births
Living people
Footballers from Zaragoza
American soccer players
United States men's youth international soccer players
Spanish footballers
Spanish emigrants to the United States
Orlando City SC players
Orlando City B players
Phoenix Rising FC players
Homegrown Players (MLS)
NC State Wolfpack men's soccer players
SIMA Águilas players
Association football midfielders
Soccer players from Orlando, Florida
USL Championship players
USL League Two players
Major League Soccer players
North Carolina FC U23 players
San Antonio FC players